Byblis aquatica is an insectivorous plant belonging to the genus Byblis, commonly known as the rainbow plants. It was described by Allen Lowrie and John Godfrey Conran in 1998, assigned to a group of annual north Australian species known as the "Byblis liniflora complex". It grows in semi-aquatic conditions and uses stalked mucilaginous glands (similar to those employed by the unrelated sundews and Drosophyllum) covering its leaf surfaces to attract, catch, and digest insect prey to supplement the poor environmental nutrient supply.

Plant characteristics

Habit 
Byblis aquatica is an annual plant with a usually unbranching central stem supported by fine, fibrous roots. After that it leans on neighboring plants for support, eventually toppling and growing horizontally along the ground or water surface, with only the growth tip growing uprightly.

Leaves
Young leaves are bright green and grow uprightly; as they age, they darken to a maroon (color) and droop. The leaf surface is covered with stalked mucilaginous glands along its entire length. These serve not only to attract and trap insect prey, but also allow the plant to "hold on" to neighboring structures for support.

Flowers and fruit

Byblis aqauatica flowers are born singly at the tip of  stems similar in appearance to the leaves. These emerge from the leaf axes in mature plants. The five-petaled flowers deep purple flowers appear between January and May (during the Australian summer), although only a few at a time. 

The pistils are 2–2.5 mm long and bear a rough stigma.

The dry capsule only opens after being soaked in water(see water dispersal).

Distribution
This species has a very limited distribution in the Australian Northern Territory. It is endemic to the area between Darwin and Berry Springs, but is fairly common there. It grows in the loamy sand of seasonally flooded depressions and in the shallow margins of freshwater lagoons. Here it shares its habitat with B. liniflora. which is however native to dryer regions elsewhere.

Botanical history
Byblis aquatica was first collected by Allen Lowrie in April 1988. In cultivation it was taken for an ecotype of B. liniflora and assigned the name Byblis aff. liniflora "Darwin".  It remained thus until Barry Meyers-Rice demonstrated evidence of the reproductive isolation of the species, at which Jan Flisek suggested the description of the taxa as a new species in 1996. Allen Lowrie did so as part of his revision of north Australian species in 1998.

References 

 Lowrie, Allen and Conran, John G. 1998. A Taxonomic Revision Of The Genus Byblis (Byblidaceae) In Northern Australia. In: Nuytsia 12(1):59-74.
 Conran, John G. and Lowrie, Allen. 1993. Byblis liniflora subsp. occidentalis (Byblidaceae), A New Subspecies From North-Western Australia. In: Austral. Syst. Bot. 6: 175-179.

Further reading 

 Meyers-Rice, Barry. Byblis - Notes On Forms New To Cultivation. In: Carnivorous Plant Newsletter 22: 39-40.
 Flísek, Jan. Byblis aff. liniflora "Darwin" - Novy druh rodu Byblis? In: Trifid, Darwiniana 4: 27-28, 43.

aquatica
Flora of the Northern Territory
Least concern flora of Australia
Plants described in 1998